Bwana Mkubwa is a constituency of the National Assembly of Zambia. It covers Bwana Mkubwa, Chichele, Itawa/Ndeke,  Kantolomba, Kavu/Kan'gonga, Mushili, Munkulungwe and Twashuka/Kaloko in the Ndola District of Copperbelt Province.

List of MPs

References

Constituencies of the National Assembly of Zambia
1983 establishments in Zambia
Constituencies established in 1983
Ndola